The Hollywood Music in Media Award for Best Original Score in a Horror Film is one of the awards given annually to people working in the motion picture industry by the Hollywood Music in Media Awards (HMMA). It is presented to the composers who have composed the best "original" score, written specifically for a sci-fi/fantasy motion picture. It was grouped with "sci-fi/fantasy" films, until it was given its own category in 2020. The award was first given in 2014, during the fifth annual awards.

Winners and nominees

2010s
Hollywood Music in Media Award for Best Original Score in a Sci-Fi/Fantasy Film

Hollywood Music in Media Award for Best Original Score in a Sci-Fi/Fantasy/Horror Film

Hollywood Music in Media Award for Best Original Score in a Horror Film

2020s

References

Best Original Score in a Horror Film
Film awards for best score